K. R. Sundaram is an Indian politician and former Member of the Legislative Assembly of Tamil Nadu. He was elected to the Tamil Nadu legislative assembly from Gudiyatham constituency as a Communist Party of India (Marxist) candidate in the 1980 and 1989 elections.

References 

Members of the Tamil Nadu Legislative Assembly
Living people
Communist Party of India (Marxist) politicians from Tamil Nadu
Year of birth missing (living people)